Lucjan Kulej, nom de guerre Ostoja (November 26, 1896 – July 13, 1971) was a Polish jurist and ice hockey player who competed in the 1928 Winter Olympics.

He was born in Danków, Częstochowa County, and died in Katowice.

In 1928, he participated with the Polish ice hockey team in the Olympic tournament.

During World War II, he was a member of Armia Krajowa and was a judge in an underground court. He took a part in the Warsaw Uprising.

External links
 Lucjan Kulej (1896-1971), Polski Komitet Olimpijski 

1896 births
1971 deaths
AZS Warszawa (ice hockey) players
People from Kłobuck County
Poland men's national ice hockey team coaches
Sportspeople from Silesian Voivodeship
Polish ice hockey coaches
Olympic ice hockey players of Poland
Ice hockey players at the 1928 Winter Olympics
Home Army members
Warsaw Uprising insurgents